The term globohomo may refer to:
Global homogenization, a term for globalization
Globohomo, a nickname for the Corporate Memphis or Alegria illustration style associated with multinational businesses
Global homosexualism, a term for the global gay agenda